My Father's Son is the eleventh studio album by American country music artist Ricky Skaggs. It was released on September 10, 1991 via Epic Records. The albums ioncludes the singles "Life's Too Long (To Live Like This)", "Same Ol' Love" and "From the Word Love".

Track listing

Personnel
Adapted from liner notes.

Brian Ahern - acoustic guitar (track 8)
Eddie Bayers - drums (tracks 3-5, 8, 9)
Barry Beckett - organ (tracks 1, 10)
Sam Bush - mandolin (track 7)
Terry Crisp - steel guitar (tracks 2, 5, 8, 10)
Jerry Douglas - dobro (track 7)
Stuart Duncan - fiddle (tracks 7, 9)
Keith Edwards - drums (track 2)
John G. Elliott - piano (track 12), string arrangements (track 12)
Bela Fleck - banjo (track 7)
Paul Franklin - steel guitar (tracks 3, 4)
Steve Gibson - electric guitar (track 5)
Bobby Hicks - fiddle (track 2)
David Hungate - bass guitar (tracks 1, 3, 4, 7-10)
Roy Huskey Jr. - slap bass (tracks 1-3, 9)
John Barlow Jarvis - keyboards (track 7), piano (tracks 1, 3, 5, 8-10)
Waylon Jennings - duet vocals (track 2)
Lenny LeBlanc - background vocals (track 10)
Keith Little - acoustic guitar (track 2) 
Larrie Londin - drums (tracks 1, 7, 10)
The Nashville String Machine - strings (track 12)
Brent Mason - electric guitar (tracks 1, 3, 4, 7-10)
Mac McAnally - acoustic guitar (tracks 1-5, 7-10), electric guitar (track 3), keyboards (track 5), background vocals (tracks 3, 4, 6-8)
Steve Nathan - keyboards (track 4), organ (track 2)
Tom Roady - percussion (track 4)
Mike Rojas - piano (track 2) 
Jason Sellers - bass guitar (track 2)
Keith Sewell - acoustic guitar (track 4), background vocals (track 4)
Ricky Skaggs - acoustic guitar (tracks 6, 11), acoustic guitar solo (track 1), banjo (track 6), Earthwood bass (track 6), electric guitar (tracks 2, 3), electric guitar solo (track 3), fiddle (track 6), mandolin (tracks 1, 6, 8, 9), lead vocals (all tracks), harmony vocals (track 2), background vocals (tracks 1, 3-10)
Leland Sklar - bass guitar (tracks 5, 11)
Bobby Taylor - oboe (track 12)
Sharon White - duet vocals (track 8), background vocals (track 8)

Chart performance

References

1991 albums
Ricky Skaggs albums
Albums produced by Brian Ahern (producer)
Albums produced by Mac McAnally
Albums produced by Ricky Skaggs
Epic Records albums